Grace Eldering (September 5, 1900 – August 31, 1988) was an American public health scientist, known for her involvement in the creation of a vaccine for whooping cough along with Loney Gordon and Pearl Kendrick.

Early life and education
Grace Eldering was born in Rancher, Montana, in 1900. Eldering's parents had immigrated to the United States before she was born, with her mother having arrived from Scotland and her father from the Netherlands. She contracted and survived whooping cough when she was five, leading to her involvement in science in her adulthood. After high school Eldering attended the University of Montana for four semesters before money troubles caused her to drop out. She taught for four years saving up enough money to return to the university and obtain a Bachelor of Science. She then went on to teach at Hysham High School for an English class and a Biology class. She continued her education later in life and earned a Ph.D. in science in 1942 from Johns Hopkins University.

Career and research
In 1928, Eldering moved to Lansing, Michigan to volunteer at Michigan Bureau of Laboratories. She was hired within six months to do routine bacteriologic analysis. She eventually moved to the Michigan Department of Health Laboratory in Grand Rapids, Michigan where she joined Pearl Kendrick and Loney Clinton Gordon to work on growing samples of pertussis bacteria in 1932. The development of the vaccine for pertussis also included the first "large-scale controlled clinical trial for pertussis vaccine". This was conducted by setting up a large network of medical professionals and neighborhood organizations in order to obtain large samples of pertussis from as many different patients as possible. Kendrick and Eldering started a "cough plate diagnostic service" on November 1, 1932, whereby cough plates of suspected infected individuals could be sent in for confirmation. This also allowed them to determine the time period of infectivity of pertussis and when those infected were at highest risk of infecting others around them. In addition, they set up a method of quarantine for Grand Rapids that would keep any outbreaks from spreading and required a 35-day period of isolation for infected patients. Within three years, their methods had become an official routine for the county and the state at large. While trying to create these methods, Eldering and Kendrick faced many troubles while trying to find the funding to do so. Their research took place in the middle of the Great Depression, making already scarce funding harder to get a hold of. They eventually received funding from federal emergency relief programs, city government and private donors. The whole experiment was conducted after hours at work because the health department was so understaffed they couldn’t spend time on it during normal work hours. They also had nurse technicians and private physicians volunteer their time to help prepare and give the vaccine.

While the methods developed had allowed Kendrick and Eldering to make specific vaccines for those infected, they didn't begin work on a general vaccine until late 1933. Their outreach system among physicians, city officials, and school administrations allowed rapid inoculation of children and other city inhabitants. This trial ran for more than three years (March 1934-November 1937) and enrolled more than 5,815 children. The design and procedures for the trials were a work in progress considering neither Kendrick or Eldering had experience in creating trials. In October 1935 the pair presented their preliminary findings at the annual American Public Health Association meeting. Many senior figures at this meeting did not want to endorse the vaccine they created because they felt it was not adequately tested. Eventually Kendrick and Eldering called in a consultant for their trial, Wade Hampton Frost. Frost was a professor of epidemiology at Johns Hopkins and made two separate trips to Grand Rapids in November 1936, and in December 1937 to critique the trial and help make a plan for analyzing the results of the vaccine. They continued working on refining their inoculation methods through 1938, when they instituted a three vaccine system that involved less of the inactivated bacteria, but was found to be much more effective at providing resistance to infection. Mass production of this new version began across Michigan in 1938 and nationwide by 1940.

In 1951, Eldering succeeded Kendrick as Chief of the Western Michigan Laboratory of the Health Department, and remained there until she retired in 1969. Eldering continued to live in Grand Rapids and volunteer with the blind and physically handicapped until she died in 1988.

Awards and honors
Eldering was inducted into the Michigan Women's Hall of Fame in 1983 for her work in public health.

References

1900 births
1988 deaths
People from Grand Rapids, Michigan
People from Treasure County, Montana
University of Montana alumni
Johns Hopkins University alumni
Vaccinologists
20th-century American women scientists